Wheeling is a city in the U.S. state of West Virginia. Located almost entirely in Ohio County, of which it is the county seat, it lies along the Ohio River in the foothills of the Appalachian Mountains and also contains a tiny portion extending into Marshall County. Wheeling is located about 60 miles (96 km) west of Pittsburgh and is the principal city of the Wheeling metropolitan area. As of the 2020 census, the city had a population of 27,062, and the metro area had a population of 145,205.

Wheeling was originally a settlement in the British colony of Virginia, and later the second-largest city in the Commonwealth of Virginia. During the American Civil War, Wheeling was the host of the Wheeling Conventions that led to the formation of West Virginia, and it was the first capital of the new state. Due to its location along major transportation routes, including the Ohio River, National Road, and the B&O Railroad, Wheeling became a manufacturing center in the late nineteenth century. After the closing of factories and substantial population loss following World War II, Wheeling's major industries now include healthcare, education, law and legal services, entertainment and tourism, and energy.

From the acceptance of the new state of West Virginia into the union on June 20, 1863, until the Restored Government of Virginia's move to Alexandria in August of the same year, Wheeling was the state capital of both West Virginia and Virginia.

History

Arrival of early Europeans
The origins of the name "Wheeling" are disputed. One of the more credible explanations is that the word comes from the Lenni-Lenape phrase wih link or wee lunk, which meant "place of the head" or "place of the skull." This name supposedly referred to a white settler who was scalped and decapitated. His severed head was displayed at the confluence of Wheeling Creek and the Ohio River. Native Americans had inhabited the area for thousands of years. In the 17th century, the Iroquois from present-day New York state conquered the upper Ohio Valley, pushing out other tribes and maintaining the area as their hunting ground.

Originally explored by the French, Wheeling still has a lead plate remnant that the explorer Céloron de Blainville buried in 1749 at the mouth of Wheeling Creek to mark his claim. Later, Christopher Gist and George Washington surveyed the land, in 1751 and 1770, respectively.

Establishment of European settlement
During the fall of 1769, Ebenezer Zane explored the Wheeling area and established claim to the land via "tomahawk rights", the practice of girdling a few trees at a prominent site and marking the bark with the initials or name of the person making the claim. He returned the following spring with his wife Elizabeth and his younger brothers, Jonathan and Silas; they established the first permanent European settlement in the Wheeling area, naming it Zanesburg. Other families joined the settlement, including the Shepherds (see Monument Place), the Wetzels, and the McCollochs (see McColloch's Leap).

In 1787, the United States gave Virginia this portion of lands west of the Appalachians, and some to Pennsylvania at its western edge, to settle their claims. By the Northwest Ordinance that year, it established the Northwest Territory to cover other lands north of the Ohio River and west to the Mississippi River. Settlers began to move into new areas along the Ohio.

In 1793, Ebenezer Zane divided the town into lots, and Wheeling was officially established as a town in 1795 by legislative enactment. The town was incorporated January 16, 1805. On March 11, 1836, the town of Wheeling was incorporated into the city of Wheeling.

By an act of the Virginia General Assembly on December 27, 1797, Wheeling was named the county seat of Ohio County.

Fort Henry
Originally dubbed Fort Fincastle in 1774, the fort was later renamed Fort Henry in honor of Virginia's American governor, Patrick Henry. In 1777, Native Americans of the Shawnee, Wyandot, and Mingo tribes joined to attack pioneer settlements along the upper Ohio River, which were illegal according to the Crown's Proclamation of 1763. They hoped an alliance with the British would drive the colonial settlers out of their territory.

Local men defended the fort, later joined by recruits from Fort Shepherd (in Elm Grove) and Fort Holliday. The native force burned the surrounding cabins and destroyed livestock.

During the first attack of the year, Major Samuel McColloch led a small force of men from Fort Vanmetre along Short Creek to assist the besieged Fort Henry. Separated from his men, McColloch was chased by attacking natives. Upon his horse, McColloch charged up Wheeling Hill and made what is known as McColloch's Leap  down its eastern side.

In 1782, a native army along with British soldiers attempted to take Fort Henry. During this siege, Fort Henry's supply of ammunition was exhausted. The defenders decided to dispatch a man to secure more ammunition from the Zane homestead. Betty Zane volunteered for the dangerous task. During her departing run, she was heckled by both native and British soldiers. After reaching the Zane homestead, she gathered a tablecloth and filled it with gunpowder. During her return, she was fired upon but was uninjured. As a result of her heroism, Fort Henry remained in American control.

Role as transportation hub

The National Road arrived in Wheeling in 1818, linking the Ohio River to the Potomac River, and allowing goods from the Ohio Valley to flow through Wheeling and on to points east. As the endpoint of the National Road, Wheeling became a gateway to early westward expansion. In 1849 the Wheeling Suspension Bridge crossed the Ohio River and allowed the city to expand onto Wheeling Island. Lessons learned in constructing the bridge were used in the construction of the Brooklyn Bridge. Rail transportation reached Wheeling in 1853 when the Baltimore and Ohio Railroad connected Wheeling to Pennsylvania, Maryland, and markets in the Northeast. A new bridge connected the city to Bellaire, Ohio, just across the river, and to western areas of the U.S.

Anti-slavery sentiment
Much of the area had been settled by yeoman farmers, few of whom owned slaves. With the railroad, a larger industrial or mercantile middle class developed that depended on free labor; it felt either disinterest or hostility to slavery. The Wheeling Intelligencer newspaper expressed the area's anti-secession sentiment as tensions rose over slavery and national issues. The city became part of the movement of western areas to secede from Virginia after the beginning of the Civil War, hosting the Wheeling Convention of 1861. It served as the provisional capital of the Restored Government of Virginia from 1861 to 1863, and became the first capital of West Virginia after the state seceded from Virginia and was admitted to the Union in its own right in 1863.

The growing German population, which included immigrants after the 1848 Revolutions, was firmly anti-slavery. The Germans of Wheeling organized the "First West Virginia Artillery" to oppose the Confederacy and played a role in the initial movement to separate from Virginia. The Germans' culture influenced the city, such as their "German Singing Societies", the first of which began in 1855.

Post-Civil War growth

Although Wheeling lost its position as state capital in 1865, it continued to grow. In the late nineteenth century, Wheeling was the new state's prime industrial center. One early nickname (until an 1885 strike) was "Nail City", reflecting the iron manufacture in several mills, which dated from the 1840s. Mills transformed pig iron into sheets that could be cut, and some mills also produced boiler plates, stoves, barrel rings, and/or ornamental ironwork. Noted businesses of the era included the Bloch Brothers Tobacco Company (owned by state senator Jesse A. Bloch, who would in 1913 introduce legislation that became the state's Workmen's Compensation Act), and later steel concerns after development of the Bessemer process. Wheeling Steel Corporation was created in 1920 and grew after a 1927 strike caused J.P. Morgan and other investors to sell National Tube Company, which had been created in 1899, six years after local owners had consolidated five plants in the area as Wheeling Steel & Iron Company.

In 1866, Lincoln School opened in Wheeling to serve African American students. Lincoln High School was taught by Laura Grayson-Morison. A new building for Lincoln High School opened in the early 1940s; the school closed with desegregation in 1954.

Wheeling had considerable associations with the American labor movement. In 1904 it became the first city in the country to refuse a proposed Andrew Carnegie gift of a free library, because of the industrialist's labor record, especially the notorious Homestead Strike of 1892. By contrast, cigar tycoon Augustus Pollack (despite once rousing controversy by a plan to use convict labor) left many bequests to the labor movement, which erected a memorial statue. The city's earliest union was the United Nailers (1860, which later merged into the Amalgamated Association of Iron and Steel Workers), followed by the cigar makers in 1862. The 1877 railroad strike at Martinsburg, West Virginia, reached Wheeling and spread nationwide. In 1897, Eugene Debs, Mother Jones, and Samuel Gompers were among the speakers at a national labor convention in Wheeling to discuss a nationwide coal strike.

With industry, Wheeling reached its peak of population in 1930. As the city grew, prosperous Wheeling residents built fine houses, especially on Wheeling Island, but slums also expanded. As a result of that growth, an ordinance was passed regulating personal cesspools, including a ban on pipe communications with other homes and businesses unless offensive smells were properly trapped.

Modern decline 

The Great Depression, and later changes and restructuring in heavy industry following World War II, led to a loss of working-class jobs and population. Capitalizing on its rich architectural heritage, Wheeling has worked to revive its Main Street.

Geography
Wheeling is located at  (40.070348, -80.698604).

Wheeling is located in northern West Virginia, on what is known as the Northern Panhandle. The area lies within the ecoregion of the Western Allegheny Plateau. It is a part of the tri-state area of Ohio, Pennsylvania, and West Virginia, which is commonly referred to as the Ohio River Valley Region or "The Ohio Valley".

Wheeling Creek flows through the city, and meets the Ohio River in downtown Wheeling.

The city is located both on the West Virginia side of the Ohio River, and on an island in the middle of the river called Wheeling Island.

Climate
Wheeling lies at the boundary between the humid subtropical and humid continental climate zones (Köppen: Cfa/Dfa, respectively). The annual precipitation is about  inches, distributed evenly throughout the year.

Demographics

2010 census
As of the census of 2010, there were 28,486 people, 12,816 households, and 6,949 families residing in the city. The racial makeup of the city was 91.2% White, 5.1% African American, 0.2% Native American, 0.9% Asian, 0.2% from other races, and 2.4% from two or more races. Hispanic or Latino people of any race were 0.9% of the population.

There were 12,816 households, of which 22.6% had children under the age of 18 living with them, 37.6% were married couples living together, 12.7% had a female householder with no husband present, 4.0% had a male householder with no wife present, and 45.8% were non-families. 40.4% of all households were made up of individuals, and 17.5% had someone living alone who was 65 years of age or older. The average household size was 2.11 and the average family size was 2.84.

The median age in the city was 45.2 years. 18.5% of residents were under the age of 18; 9.4% were between the ages of 18 and 24; 21.8% were from 25 to 44; 29.8% were from 45 to 64; and 20.6% were 65 years of age or older. The gender makeup of the city was 46.9% male and 53.1% female.

2000 census
As of the census of 2000, 31,419 people, 13,719 households, and 7,806 families resided in the city. The population density was 2,258.4 people per square mile (872.1/km2). 15,706 housing units were present, at an average density of 1,128.9 per square mile (436.0/km2). The racial makeup of the city was 92.72% White, 4.99% African American, 0.10% Native American, 0.91% Asian, 0.03% Pacific Islander, 0.16% from other races, and 1.09% from two or more races. Hispanic or Latino people of any race were 0.58% of the population.

There were 13,719 households, of which 23.4% included children under the age of 18, 41.8% were married couples living together, 12.2% had a female householder with no husband present, and 43.1% were non-families. 38.3% of all households were made up of individuals, and 18.6% had someone living alone who was at least 65 years of age. The average household size was 2.17 and the average family size was 2.89.

The median age was 42 years. 20.6% of residents were under the age of 18, 9.1% from 18 to 24, 24.3% from 25 to 44, 24.5% from 45 to 64, and 21.6% at least 65 years old. For every 100 females 84.1 males were present, and for every 100 females age 18 and over, there were 79.6 males.

The median household income was $27,388, and the median family income was $38,708. Males had a median income of $30,750 versus $22,099 for females. The per capita income for the city was $17,923. About 13.1% of families and 18.0% of the population were below the poverty line, including 23.3% of those under age 18 and 11.2% of those at least 65 years old.

Government
Under West Virginia law, cities may adopt a form of government called the Manager-Mayor Plan, under which Wheeling operates. The elected mayor presides over meetings of the Wheeling City Council, which has six members elected from geographic wards. City Council members serve four-year terms. The City Council also confirms executive nominations for members to various boards, which have limited regulatory authority, including the Planning Commission, the Board of Zoning Appeals, and the Traffic Commission. The City Manager serves as Chief Executive and Administrative Officer for the city.

The current mayor of Wheeling is Glenn Elliott, and the current city manager is Robert Herron. The current members of the City Council are Vice-Mayor Chad Thalman (1st Ward), Ben Seidler (2nd Ward), Rosemary Ketchum (3rd Ward), Jerry Sklavounakis (4th Ward), Ty Thorngate (5th Ward), and Dave Palmer (6th Ward). City elections were held on June 9, 2020, and the current term began on July 1, 2020. City elections will be held again on May 14, 2024.

City flag
The current flag for the city was adopted on September 4, 2018, in conjunction with the celebration of the city's 250th anniversary the following year. Its design and symbolism are credited to the Wheeling Committee on Retention and the Wheeling 250 subcommittee.

The flag features two horizontal blue bars to represent Wheeling Creek and the Ohio River, with a white bar in between. The three bars also symbolize the three major modes of transportation found in Wheeling history: river, road, and rail. Representing five distinct eras of Wheeling history, five stars are centered in a row in the white bar:
The Indigenous Star, The Frontier Star, The Transportation Star, The Statehood Star, and The Industrial Star.

Attractions

Historical buildings
The city of Wheeling has a rich and varied history. West Virginia Independence Hall was the site of the Wheeling Convention, two meetings held in 1861 that ultimately reversed Virginia's Ordinance of Secession. 26 counties in Virginia's north and west voted against secession from the Union and created the new state of West Virginia, which the United States quickly admitted. Later in 1861 and continuing to 1863, the building was the site of many heated debates during the First Constitutional Convention of West Virginia, including the name of the new state. The oldest building in the area is Shepherd Hall (Monument Place), built in 1798.

Wheeling is home to Centre Market, formerly Wheeling's market house. Built in 1853, the market house and the surrounding area have been adapted for use as retail shops and restaurants.

The first official memorial monument in the state of West Virginia, dedicated specifically to men killed in the Vietnam War, was dedicated in Wheeling, with full military honors, in a Memorial Day 1986 ceremony. The monument was erected in front of the flagpole near the main shelter of Bethlehem Community Park in the village of Bethlehem, just southeast of Wheeling.
The roughly 6-foot-high granite memorial consists of a large bronze dedication plaque with the names of KIAs from the Wheeling/Ohio County region. Below the dedication plaque is a bronze map of South Vietnam, complete with names of 28 major cities.

Parks and recreation
Wheeling features several municipal parks, including Oglebay Resort & Conference Center and Wheeling Park. Ohio County has six golf courses, including designs by renowned golfer Arnold Palmer and architect Robert Trent Jones.

In October 2007 the City of Wheeling opened the state's first concrete skateboard park. The  facility was designed and built by world-renowned skatepark builder Grindline, of Seattle, Washington. The park consists of 60% bowls and 40% street elements; it is located within the Chambers Ballfield Complex in the Elm Grove section of the city. An addition to the street section of the park was completed by Grindline in November 2009. A covered shelter, restrooms, and webcam are installed. The park is lighted and open 24/7.

Education

Primary and secondary
As elsewhere in West Virginia, K–12 schools are organized at the county level of government. The public school system, Ohio County Schools, consists of 14 schools: nine elementary schools; four middle schools, which include Triadelphia Middle, nominated for the blue ribbon school award; and the nationally recognized Wheeling Park High School. Several parochial and private schools, including Wheeling Central Catholic High School and the Linsly School, are located in the city.

Postsecondary
Wheeling is the hub of higher education in the Northern Panhandle of West Virginia. Wheeling University, a private university and the only Catholic college in the state of West Virginia, is located here.

The main campus of West Virginia Northern Community College has recently been expanding with centers in downtown Wheeling; it focuses on job training and community development. Also located in close proximity to the city are West Liberty University (formerly West Liberty State College), a four-year university, and private Bethany College, giving area residents a wide variety of educational options.

Entertainment

Music
Wheeling has a long tradition of live musical performance and radio broadcasting. With over 2,500 seats, The Capitol Theatre is the largest theatre in West Virginia. Opened in 1928, The Capitol was home to It's Wheeling Steel, a popular radio program in the early 1940s featuring musical performances by workers at a local steel plant. The Capitol has welcomed musical performances of all types, from Johnny Cash, Merle Haggard, and Tammy Wynette, to Ray Charles, Bob Dylan, B.B. King, and Black Sabbath. Other past performers include Jerry Seinfeld, David Copperfield, and George Carlin.

The Wheeling Symphony Orchestra is housed at the Capitol Theatre and performs a range of contemporary, classical, and seasonal arrangements.

Wheeling is also home to the Victoria Theater, the oldest theater in West Virginia. The 700-seat Victorian-style theater was home to the WWVA Jamboree program from 1933–1936. More recently, it has been the site for the "Wheeling Jamboree", a local initiative started in 2009 and modeled after the original WWVA Jamboree (which changed its name in the 1960s to Jamboree U.S.A.). The original WWVA Jamboree ran from 1933–2007, making it the second-longest-running country radio program and variety show in the country, after the "Grand Ole Opry" in Nashville, Tennessee.

Live music emanates from the amphitheatre at the Wheeling Heritage Port several nights per week from mid-spring through late fall. The waterfront park area hosts festivals, concerts, movie nights, celebrations, a regatta, and numerous visits from the Delta, Mississippi and American Queen riverboats. The Port holds over 8,000 spectators and has become a city focal point.

Formerly held in nearby Belmont County, Ohio, Jamboree In The Hills draws over 100,000 country music fans to the Wheeling area every July.

Theater
Fans of theater have several options in Wheeling. The Capitol Theatre hosts numerous touring musical performances. The Oglebay Institute's Towngate Theatre in Center Wheeling has produced plays for over 35 years.

Sports
Wheeling, known as Nail City, is home to the Wheeling Nailers hockey team. The Nailers play in the WesBanco Arena (formerly the Wheeling Civic Center), and are part of the Central division of the Western Conference of the ECHL. Formerly home to the Ohio Valley Greyhounds, Wheeling became home to a second team in 2009. The team, known as the Wheeling Wildcats, played in the Continental Indoor Football League but folded after the 2009 season. High school football and soccer are played at Wheeling Island Stadium.

Wheeling is also home of the Mountain East Conference basketball championship tournament, an NCAA Division II conference that launched in the 2013–14 school year. Wheeling University and West Liberty are both charter members of the new conference, an offshoot of the now-disbanded West Virginia Intercollegiate Athletic Conference.

Live racing and gaming
Wheeling is the home of Wheeling Island Hotel-Casino-Racetrack, located on Wheeling Island. Formerly known as Wheeling Downs, the facility features live greyhound racing, slots, poker games, and casino-style table games.

In accordance with House Bill 271, adopted on March 8, 2007, Ohio County and Jefferson County held special elections on June 9, 2007, to approve the legalization of table games within the respective counties. The Ohio County measure passed, but the Jefferson County one failed. A similar measure was successfully adopted in Hancock County on June 30, 2007.

Media

Located close to Pittsburgh, Wheeling is heavily influenced by its broadcast media outlets, which are easily received in the area. Besides broadcast stations, Wheeling's cable providers carry AT&T SportsNet Pittsburgh and the Pittsburgh-centric news/talk channel PCNC as its "home" sports and information sources.

In addition to the Pittsburgh outlets, the Wheeling television market is served by ABC/CBS affiliate WTRF-TV Channel 7, PBS affiliate W30CO-D Channel 30, and NBC/FOX affiliate WTOV-TV Channel 9 in nearby Steubenville, Ohio. Cable television provider Comcast serves the city, parts of which Centre TV also services.

Wheeling is home to WWVA 1170 AM, the state's only 50,000-watt AM station, which can be heard throughout the East Coast at night. WVLY 1370 AM and WKKX 1600 AM provide local news, sports, and talk. On the FM dial, WVKF 95.7, WKWK 97.3, WOVK 98.7, and WEGW 107.5 provide the area with various music genres. The Wheeling area is the home of WDUQ-LP, a listener-supported commercial-free station, which also serves as the local Pacifica affiliate. Pittsburgh's radio stations provide Wheeling with coverage. Several translators and repeater stations provide NPR and American Family Radio networks. Wheeling also has a student-run radio station, WPHP 91.9, operated by Wheeling Park High School students. WPHP plays top 40 songs and also covers all of the Wheeling Park Patriots' football and basketball games.

The city is home to The Intelligencer and the Wheeling News-Register newspapers, owned by Wheeling-based Ogden Newspapers Inc. The Intelligencer is published weekday mornings and Saturdays, while the News-Register is published weekday afternoons and Sundays. The Times-Leader of Martins Ferry, Ohio, another Ogden Newspapers Inc. paper, also covers Wheeling issues. In Wheeling magazine is published quarterly and covers society and events in the city. Two local websites, Weelunk and Dateline: Wheeling, serve as independent news sources for the city.

Transportation

Roads and bridges

Interstate 70 and its spur Interstate 470 run through the city east-west and link it with suburban Pittsburgh, Pennsylvania, to the east and Ohio to the west. U.S. Route 40/National Road links downtown with residential neighborhoods to the east. West Virginia Route 2 connects Wheeling with Moundsville to the south and Weirton to the north. U.S. Route 250 also runs through the city.

The Fort Henry Bridge and Vietnam Veterans Memorial Bridge carry I-70 and I-470, respectively, over the Ohio River. The historic Wheeling Suspension Bridge, completed in 1849, which was part of National Road, connects downtown and Wheeling Island; currently it is closed for safety reasons, by order of the state highway department, to vehicular traffic. I-70 passes under Wheeling Hill through the Wheeling Tunnel.

Bus transportation

Bus transportation to points throughout North America is available from Wheeling through Greyhound Lines. The bus terminal, the Robert C. Byrd Intermodal Transportation Center, was built with $11.1 million in federal funds.

The East Ohio Authority and the Ohio Valley Regional Transit Authority (OVRTA), which share the Intermodal Transportation Center as the hub for hub-and-spoke routes, provide regional transportation through West Virginia and Eastern Ohio.

Wheeling operated streetcars from the 1880s until 1943 under the Wheeling Traction Company and Co-operative Transit Company. Buses replaced streetcar operations due to operating costs.

Air transportation

The city is served by the Wheeling Ohio County Airport for general aviation and by Pittsburgh International Airport for passenger service.

Neighborhoods
The following neighborhoods lie within the city limits:

Arbordale
Benwood (mostly in Marshall County)
Bethlehem
Center Wheeling
Clator
Dimmeydale
Downtown
East Wheeling
Echo Point
Egewood
Elm Grove
Elm Terrace
Fulton
Glenova/North Warwood
Glenwood
Goosetown
Greggsville
Leatherwood
Loveland/South Warwood
Morningside
Mozart (partially in Marshall County)
Mount Olivet (mostly in Marshall County)
North Park
North Wheeling
Oakmont
Oakmont Hills
Oak Park
Oglebay
Overbrook
Park View
Pleasanton
Pleasant Valley/“Silk Stocking Row”
Richietown (northern South Wheeling)
Rio Vista (accessible only through the Village of Bethlehem)
Roney’s Point
Sherrard (in Marshall County)
South Wheeling
Springdale
Warwood
Triadelphia
Wheeling Heights (Grandview Heights)
Wheeling Island
Woodsdale (formerly Woodlawn)

Notable people

 Austin E. Renforth, Major General, USMC
 Jodi Applegate, TV news anchor
 Leon "Chu" Berry, jazz saxophonist
 Thais Blatnik, West Virginia journalist and politician
 Robert Boury, classical pianist
 Leo Brady, playwright, novelist, and director
 Adelbert R. Buffington, U.S. Army general
 Jesse Burkett, Hall of Fame baseball player
 Bobby Campo, actor
 Jack Canfield, motivational speaker
 John Corbett, actor
 Billy Cox, bassist
Jesse Cox, internet personality
 Henrietta Crosman, actress
 Belle Caldwell Culbertson, author and philanthropist
 Annie Sinclair Cunningham (1832–1897), religious worker, Wheeling Hall of Fame
 Faith Daniels, network broadcaster
 Rebecca Harding Davis, author
 Joseph M. Devine, Governor of North Dakota, 1898–1899
 Joyce DeWitt, actress
 Joanne Dru, actress
 William L. Elkins, 19th-century business tycoon
 Doug Fetherling, writer
 Walter L. Fisher, U.S. Secretary of the Interior
 Mike Florio, sportswriter
 Kelsey Fowler, Broadway actress
 Virginia Fox, actress
 Gene Freese, baseball player
Rosemary Front, disability rights advocate
 Rob Garrison, actor
 Cynthia Germanotta, philanthropist and businesswoman, mother of Lady Gaga
 Jack Glasscock, Major League Baseball player
 Michael Grove, baseball player
 George Herbig, astronomer
 Chuck Howley, NFL linebacker for Chicago Bears and Dallas Cowboys
 Lois Kibbee, actress
 Everett Lee, orchestral conductor
 Alvan Macauley, president of Packard 1916–1939
 Keith Maillard, writer
 Bill Mazeroski, Hall of Fame second baseman
 William J. Mitsch, Stockholm Water Prize laureate, ecology professor and author 
 Cy Morgan, Major League Baseball pitcher
Marion Moses, physician, labor activist
 Bob Ney, U.S. Representative from Ohio
 Robert Nutting and family, principal owners of the Pittsburgh Pirates
 Mollie O'Brien, Grammy-winning bluegrass singer
 Tim O'Brien, Grammy-winning bluegrass musician, brother of Mollie O'Brien
 Joe Pettini, former shortstop for the San Francisco Giants.
 Mark Prosser, college basketball coach
 Jesse L. Reno, Civil War general; namesake of Reno, Nevada
 Walter Reuther, labor leader
 Rick Schneider-Calabash, animation producer, writer, and director
 Eleanor Steber, operatic soprano associated with Metropolitan Opera
Chris Stirewalt, digital politics editor for the Fox News Channel
 Robert E. L. Strider, President of Colby College
 Andy Tonkovich, basketball player selected first in the 1948 BAA Draft
 Nick Turani, Internet Personality
 Edith Lake Wilkinson (1868–1957), artist
 Dave Wojcik, college basketball coach
 Doug Wojcik, college basketball coach
 Nan Wynn, big band singer and actress
 John Yarnall, naval officer during War of 1812

See also
List of cities and towns along the Ohio River

References

Further reading

 Duffy, Sean, & Rinkes, Paul. Wheeling: Then & Now. Mount Pleasant, S. Carolina: Arcadia Publishing, 2010.
 
 Fones-Wolf, Ken, Traitors in Wheeling': Secessionism in an Appalachian Unionist City", Journal of Appalachian Studies, 13 (Spring–Fall 2007), 75–95. .
 
 Minder, Mike. Wheeling's Gambling History to 1976. Wheeling: Nail City Publishing, 1997.
 Schramm, Robert W. The Linsly School. Mount Pleasant, S. Carolina: Arcadia Publishing, 2003.

External links

 Official website of the City of Wheeling, West Virginia
 Wheeling Convention and Visitor's Bureau

 
Cities in Marshall County, West Virginia
Cities in Ohio County, West Virginia
Cities in West Virginia
County seats in West Virginia
West Virginia
National Road
Populated places established in 1769
West Virginia populated places on the Ohio River